Gillian Lesley Gilbert (born 27 January 1961) is an English musician and singer, best known as the keyboardist and guitarist of the band New Order.

Early life
Gilbert's family moved from her birthplace, Manchester, to the nearby market town of Macclesfield when she was young. She disliked living in Cheshire as a teenager and had wanted to live in Manchester. In the late 1970s, seeing Siouxsie and the Banshees play live on UK television was a life changing experience for her. "Me dad always says to us, 'You changed as soon as you saw Siouxsie and the Banshees on television'... And I really liked Gaye Advert out of the Adverts, who played bass, and I thought, 'Oh, there's nobody playin' guitar' - you know, women in bands." Her uncle taught her how to play guitar.

She then was in a punk band with three girls, The Inadequates, who rehearsed at premises next to Joy Division. In a 1987 interview with Option, Gilbert reflected on the first time she became familiar with Joy Division: "We didn't have a car and us three needed a lift home. So we asked them, and they said, 'Alright, but you have to buy one of our singles.' So we did and got it home and played it on this horrible record player. We'd known Stephen before. We thought, 'My God, this sounds horrible.'" She would later begin dating Stephen Morris.

Career
After Ian Curtis's death in May 1980, the three remaining members of Joy Division renamed the band New Order. Wishing to complete their line-up with someone they knew well and whose musical skill and style was compatible with their own, New Order invited Gilbert to join the band during the early part of October 1980, as keyboardist and guitarist. She had already played with Joy Division a number of times, filling in for both Curtis and Bernard Sumner playing guitar. New Order's manager Rob Gretton suggested she should join. Gilbert's first live performance with them occurred at The Squat in Manchester on 25 October 1980.

Her voice can be heard on several New Order tracks: the 1981 single "Procession"; the 1983 single "Confusion"; "Avalanche" from the album Republic on which she sang a single word, "faith"; and "Doubts Even Here" from their first album, Movement, on which she provided a spoken-word background vocal.

Given that fellow band members Sumner and Peter Hook had already produced music outside New Order, Gilbert and Morris formed their own band, The Other Two. They released their first single "Tasty Fish" in 1991, and recorded two albums: The Other Two & You, released in 1993, and Super Highways in 1999. Gilbert and Morris were engaged in 1993, and married the following year. The couple live in Rainow, outside Macclesfield, and have two daughters. Gilbert stopped touring with New Order in 1998 so that she could care for their children, one of whom suffers from neuromyelitis optica. Her husband had briefly offered to care for the children, but Gilbert reasoned that it would be easier for the band to replace her than her husband. She participated in the recording of 2001's Get Ready, after which she was replaced by Phil Cunningham in New Order's line-up.

In 2007, Gilbert and Morris remixed two tracks for the Nine Inch Nails remixes album Year Zero Remixed. That year she was diagnosed with breast cancer, from which she recovered.

She rejoined New Order in 2011, after a 10-year absence from their albums. She performed alongside Cunningham who remained a member, expanding the group to a quintet. She is quoted as being glad that she did other things during that time. Since 2011, New Order have performed across the world. Their album Music Complete was released in September 2015. Gilbert's vocals were featured on a Koishii & Hush remix album titled Lifetime; it was released on 3 February 2016, and featured four tracks remixed by artists such as Saltmarine, Lavigne, FM Attack and Re:Locate.

Discography
With New Order

With The Other Two
 The Other Two & You (1993)
 Super Highways (1999)

References

1961 births
20th-century English musicians
21st-century English musicians
Alternative rock guitarists
Alternative rock keyboardists
Alternative rock singers
British alternative rock musicians
English dance musicians
English women guitarists
English guitarists
English new wave musicians
English rock keyboardists
Women new wave singers
Ivor Novello Award winners
Living people
New Order (band) members
People from Macclesfield
People from Whalley Range
British post-punk musicians
British synth-pop new wave musicians
English women in electronic music
20th-century English women singers
20th-century English singers
21st-century English women singers
21st-century English singers